Baba Meydan-e Sofla (also Romanized as Bābā Meydān-e Soflá; also known as Bābā Meydān and Bābā Meydān-e Pā’īn) is a village in Rostam-e Yek Rural District, in the Central District of Rostam County, Fars Province, Iran. At the 2006 census, its population was 766, in 165 families.

References 

Populated places in Rostam County